F9: The Fast Saga (Original Motion Picture Score) is the original film score album of the
2021 film of the same name. The score was released by Back Lot Music on July 2, 2021, with a total of 44 tracks, and 114 minutes and 16 seconds of music. The score was written and composed by Brian Tyler, who also wrote and composed the musical score for the third, fourth, fifth, seventh and eight installments.

Track listing
All music composed by Brian Tyler.

References

2021 soundtrack albums
Fast & Furious albums
Back Lot Music soundtracks
Brian Tyler soundtracks
Action film soundtracks
Thriller film soundtracks